This list of the Paleozoic life of Indiana contains the various prehistoric life-forms whose fossilized remains have been reported from within the US state of Indiana and are between 538.8 and 252.17 million years of age.

A

 †Abatocrinus
 †Abatocrinus grandis
  †Abrotocrinus
 †Abrotocrinus coreyi
 †Abrotocrinus nodosus
 †Abrotocrinus unicus
 †Acacocrinus
 †Acacocrinus americanus
 †Acanthopecten
 †Acanthopecten procarboniferous
 †Achistrum
 †Achistrum brevis – type locality for species
 †Achistrum ludwigi
 †Achistrum nicholsoni
 †Achistrum triassicum
 †Achradocrinus
 †Acidaspis
 †Acinophyllum
 †Acinophyllum davisi – type locality for species
 †Acratia
 †Acratia similaris
 †Acrocrinus
 †Acrocrinus constrictus
 † Acrophyllum
 †Acrophyllum ellipticum
 †Acrophyllum oneidaense
 †Acrophyllum rugosum
  †Actinocrinites
 †Actinocrinites gibsoni
 †Actinocrinites grandissimus
 †Actinocrinites lobatus – tentative report
 †Actinocrinites lowei
 †Actinopteria
 †Actinopteria boydi
 †Actinostroma
 †Adinocrinus
 †Adinocrinus nodosus
 †Aemuliophyllum
 †Aemuliophyllum exiguum
 †Aganaster
 †Aganaster gregarius
 †Agaricocrinites
  †Agaricocrinus
   †Agaricocrinus americanus
 †Agassizocrinus
 †Agassizocrinus gibbosus – or unidentified comparable form
 †Agassizocrinus laevis – or unidentified comparable form
 †Ageneracrinus
 †Ageneracrinus basalotumidus
 †Ahrensisporites
 †Ahrensisporites guerickei
 †Aipoceras – tentative report
 †Alaskadiscus
 †Alaskadiscus magnus
 †Alatisporites
 †Alatisporites trialatus
  †Alethopteris
 †Alethopteris davreuxi
 †Alethopteris decurrens
 †Alethopteris grandini
 †Alethopteris lonchitica
 †Alethopteris owenii
 †Alethopteris serlii
 †Alisocrinus
 †Alisocrinus aureatus
 †Alisocrinus caleyi
 †Alisocrinus laevis
 †Allocrinus
 †Allocrinus benedicti
 †Allocystites
 †Allocystites hammeli
 †Alloprosallocrinus
 †Alloprosallocrinus conicus
 †Allorhynchus
 †Allorhynchus curriei
 †Alveolites
 †Alveolites asperus
 †Alveolites constans
 †Alveolites dispansus
 †Alveolites expatiatus
 †Alveolites goldfussi
 †Alveolites minimus
 †Alveolites mordax
 †Alveolites squamosus
 †Alveolites winchellana
 †Amaurotoma
 †Amaurotoma leavenworthana – type locality for species
 †Amaurotoma subangulatum – type locality for species
 †Ambocoelia
 †Ambonychia
 †Ambonychia obesa
 †Ambonychia robusta
 †Ambonychia suberecta
 Ammobaculites
 †Ammobaculites leptos
 †Ammobaculites pyriformis
 Ammodiscus
 †Ammodiscus longexsertus
 †Ammonellipsites
 †Ammovertella
 †Ammovertella inclusa
 †Ampheristocystis
 †Ampheristocystis concentricus
 †Amphipora
 †Amphipsalidocrinus – type locality for genus
 †Amphipsalidocrinus inconsuetus
 †Amphipsalidocrinus scissurus – type locality for species
 †Amphissites
 †Amphissites similaris
 †Amphistrophia
 †Amphoracrinus
 †Amplexiphyllum
 †Amplexiphyllum cruciforme
 †Amplexiphyllum simplex – tentative report
 †Amplexiphyllum tenue
 †Amplexizaphrentis
 †Amplexizaphrentis spinulosus
  †Amplexopora
 †Amplexopora discoidea – or unidentified comparable form
 †Amplexus
 †Anachoropteris
 †Anachoropteris involuta
 †Anapiculatisporites
 †Anapiculatisporites baccatus
 †Anapiculatisporites spinosus
 †Anartiocystis
 †Anastrophia
 †Anastrophia internascens
 †Anchiopsis
 †Ancyrocrinus
 †Ancyrocrinus bulbosus
 †Anematina
 †Anematina proutana – type locality for species
 †Angustidontus
 †Angustidontus seriatus
 †Angyomphalus
 †Angyomphalus northviewensis – or unidentified related form
 †Anisocrinus
 †Anisocrinus laurelensis
 †Anisotrypa
 †Anisotrypa solida
 †Ankyropteris
 †Ankyropteris brongnartii
   †Annularia
 †Annularia mucronata
 †Annularia radiata
 †Annularia sphenophylloides
 †Annularia stellata
 †Anomalodonta
 †Anomalodonta gigantea
 †Anopliopsis
 †Anopliopsis subcarinata
 †Anthracospirifer
 †Anthracospirifer leidyi
 †Antirhynchonella
 †Aphelakardia
 †Aphelakardia indianense
 †Aphelecrinus
 †Aphelecrinus oweni
 †Aphelecrinus randolphensis
 †Aphelotoxon
 †Aphlebia
 †Aphlebia crispa
 †Apiculatasporites
 †Apiculatasporites latigranifer
 †Apiculatisporites
 †Apiculatisporites abditus
 †Apiculatisporites lappites
 †Apiculatisporites setulosus
 †Arabellites
 †Arabellites comis
 †Arabellites conspicuous – or unidentified comparable form
 †Arabellites cultriformis – or unidentified comparable form
 †Arabellites hamiltonesis
 †Arachnophyllum
 †Arachnophyllum striatum – or unidentified comparable form
 †Archaeopitys
 †Archaeopitys eastmanii
  †Archimedes
 †Archimedes communis
 †Archimedes compactus
 †Archimedes distans
 †Archimedes intermedius
 †Archimedes invaginatus
 †Archimedes lativolvis
 †Archimedes macfarlani
 †Archimedes meekanoides
 †Archimedes meekanus
 †Archimedes negligens – or unidentified comparable form
 †Archimedes proutanus
 †Archimedes swallovanus
 †Archimedes swallowvanus
 †Archimedes symmetricus
 †Archimedes terebriformis
 †Archinacella
 †Archinacella indianensis – type locality for species
  †Arctinurus
 †Arctinurus boltoni
 †Arjamannia
 †Arjamannia aulangonensis
 †Armenoceras
 †Armenoceras madisonense
 †Arnoldella
 †Arnoldella minuta
 †Arthroacantha
 †Arthroacantha carpenteri
 †Arthropitys
 †Arthropitys communis
 †Artisia
 †Asaphocrinus
 †Asaphocrinus minor
 †Ascoceras
 †Ascoceras newberryi
 †Ascoceras wabashense
 †Ascodictyon
 †Ascopora
 †Aspidiaria
 †Asterophyllites
 †Asterophyllites equisetiformis
 †Asterophyllites grandis
 †Asterotheca
 †Asterotheca crenulata
 †Asterotheca cyathea
 †Asterotheca hemitelliodes
 †Asterotheca miltoni
 †Asterotheca oreopteridia
  †Asteroxylon
 †Asteroxylon setchelli
 †Astraeospongium
 †Astylospongia
 †Astylospongia praemorsa
 †Atactoporella
 †Atelodictyon
 †Athyris
 †Athyris fultonensis
 †Athyris lamellosa
 †Athyris parvirostra
 †Athyris spiriferoides
  †Atrypa
 †Atrypa newsomensis
 †Atrypa parva – or unidentified comparable form
 †Atrypa reticularis
 †Atrypa reticularus
 †Atrypina
 †Atrypina disparilis
 †Aulacophyllum
 †Aulacophyllum mutabile
 †Aulacophyllum parvum
 †Aulacophyllum perlamellosum
 †Aulacophyllum pinnatum
 †Aulacophyllum sulcatum
 †Aulacotheca
 †Aulocystis
 †Aulocystis auloporidea
 †Aulocystis incrustans – tentative report
 †Aulocystis jacksoni
 †Aulocystis lucasensis
 †Aulocystis nobilis
 †Aulocystis procumbens – tentative report
 †Aulocystis transitorius – type locality for species
  †Aulopora
 †Aulopora edithana
 †Aulopora microbuccinata
 †Aulopora tubiporoides
 †Auloporella
  †Aviculopecten
 †Aviculopecten colletti
 †Aviculopecten invalidus
 †Aviculopecten spinuliferus
 †Aviculopecten terminalis
 † Avonia – tentative report
 † Avonia

B

 Bairdia
 †Bairdia compacta
 †Bairdia egorovi – or unidentified related form
 †Bairdia kinderhookensis – or unidentified related form
 †Barroisella
 †Barroisella campbelli
 †Barycrinus
 †Barycrinus asperrimus
 †Barycrinus asteriscus
 †Barycrinus cornutus
 †Barycrinus hoveyi
 †Barycrinus stenobrachium
 †Baryschyr
 †Baryschyr anosus
 †Batocrinus
 †Batocrinus grandis
 †Batocrinus isodactylus
 †Batostoma
 †Batostoma prosseri
 †Batostoma varians
 †Batostomella
 †Beatricea
 †Beatricea undulata
 †Beecheria
 †Beecheria illinoisense
 †Beecheria shumardanum – tentative report
 †Beecheria sinuata
 †Belemnospongia
 †Belemnospongia fascicularis
 †Belemnospongia parmula
  †Bellerophon
 †Bellerophon gibsoni – type locality for species
 †Bellerophon jeffersonensis
 †Bellerophon spergensis – type locality for species
 †Belodella
 †Belodella resima – or unidentified comparable form
 †Beloitoceras
 †Beloitoceras amoenum – type locality for species
 †Beloitoceras bucheri
 †Beloitoceras chapparsi
 †Beloitoceras cumingsi
 †Beloitoceras ohioense
 †Beloitoceras transiens
 †Bembexia
 †Bembexia minima
 Berenicea
 †Bethacanthus – type locality for genus
 †Bethacanthus insolitus – type locality for species
 †Bethanyphyllum
 †Bethanyphyllum arctifossa
 †Bethanyphyllum depresstum
 †Bethanyphyllum pocillum
 †Bethanyphyllum robustum
 †Bethanyphyllum validum
 †Bethanyphyllum vesiculatum
 †Beyrichoceras
 †Bigalea
 †Bigalea ohioensis – type locality for species
 †Billingsastrea
 †Billingsastrea yandelli
 †Blothrophyllum
 †Blothrophyllum bellicinctum
 †Blothrophyllum corium
 †Blothrophyllum greeni – tentative report
 †Blothrophyllum romingeri – type locality for species
 †Blothrophyllum sinuosum
 †Blothrophyllum tripinnatum
 †Blothrophyllum trisulcatum
 †Blothrophyllum zaphrentiforme
 †Blountia – tentative report
 †Bordonia
 †Bordonia knappi
 †Bothrodendron
 †Bothrodendron minutifolium
 †Botryocrinus
 †Botryocrinus nucleus
 †Botryocrinus polyxo
 †Brachythyris
 †Brachythyris fernglenensis – or unidentified related form
 †Brachythyris suborbicularis
 †Brahmacrinus
 †Brahmacrinus elongatus
 †Brittsia
 †Brittsia problematica
 †Brockocystis
 †Brockocystis nodosaria
 †Bucania
 †Bucania simulatrix – type locality for species
 †Bucanophyllum
 †Bucanophyllum ohioense
 †Bucanopsis
 †Bulimorpha
 †Bulimorpha bulimiformis – type locality for species
 †Bulimorpha elongata – type locality for species
 †Bullimorpha
    †Bumastus
 †Bumastus armatus – or unidentified comparable form
 †Bumastus insignis
 †Bumastus ioxus
 †Bumastus niagarense – or unidentified comparable form
 †Bynumina
 †Byssonychia
 †Byssonychia richmondensis
 †Bythocyproidea
 †Bythopora
 †Bythopora delicatula
 †Bythopora gracilis
 †Bythopora meeki
 †Bythopora striata

C

  †Calamites
 †Calamites cruciatus
 †Calamites suckowii
 †Calamodendron
 †Calamodendron americanum
 †Calamospora
 †Calamospora breviradiata
 †Calamospora flava
 †Calamospora hartungiana
 †Calamospora liquida
 †Calamospora mutabilis
 †Calamospora straminea
 †Calamostachys
 †Calamostachys paniculata – tentative report
 †Calamostachys superba
 †Calamostachys tuberculata
 †Calceocrinus
 †Calliocrinus
 †Calliocrinus beachleri
 †Calliocrinus cornutus
 †Callipleura
 †Callipleura nobilis
  †Callipteridium
 †Callipteridium sullivanti
 †Callistophyton
 †Callistophyton boysettii
  †Callixylon
 †Callixylon brownii
 †Callixylon newberryi
 †Callocystites
 †Callocystites brevis
 †Calocephalites
 †Calostylis
 †Calostylis trigemma – tentative report
 †Calymene
 †Calymene breviceps
  †Calymene celebra
  †Calymene niagarensis
 †Calyptactis
 †Calyptactis confragosus
 †Camarotoechia
 †Camarotoechia gregaria – tentative report
 †Camarotoechia horsfordi
 †Camarotoechia mutata
 †Camarotoechia neglecta – or unidentified comparable form
 †Camarotoechia pisa
 †Camarotoechia tethys
 †Camptocrinus
 †Camptocrinus plenicirrus
  †Carcinosoma
 †Carcinosoma newlini
 †Cardiocarpon
 †Cardiocarpon annulatum
 †Cardiocarpon dilatatus
 †Cardiocarpon ingens – tentative report
 †Cardiocarpon latealatum
 †Carneyella
 †Carpocrinus
 †Carpocrinus sculptus
 †Carpomanon
 †Caryocrinites
 †Caryocrinites bulbulus
 †Caryocrinites ellipticus
 †Caryocrinites indianensis
 †Caryocrinites laurelensis
 †Caryocrinites sphaeroidalis
 †Caryocrinites stellatus
  †Caseodus
 †Caseodus eatoni – type locality for species
 †Catazyga
 †Catazyga headi
 †Catillocrinus
 †Catillocrinus turbinatus
 †Catillocrinus wachsmuthi
 †Cavellina
 †Cayrocrinites
 †Cayugaea
 †Cayugaea subcylindrica
 †Cayugea
 †Centronella
 †Centronella campbelli
 †Centronella impressa
 †Centronella navicella
 †Ceramopora
 †Ceramopora imbricata
 †Ceramopora vesicularis
 †Ceramoporella
 †Ceramoporella ohioensis
 †Ceraurinus
 †Ceraurinus icarus
  †Ceraurus
 †Cervifurca – type locality for genus
 †Cervifurca nasuta – type locality for species
  †Chancelloria
 †Charactoceras
 †Charactoceras baeri
 †Charactoceras faberi
 †Cheilocephalus
  †Cheirurus
 †Cheirurus dilatatus
 †Chilotrypa
 †Chilotrypa ostiolata
 †Chomatodus
 †Chondrites
 †Chonetes
 †Chonetes geniculatus
 †Chonetes yandellanus
 †Chonophyllum
 †Chonophyllum nanum
 †Chonostegites
 †Chonostegites clappi
 †Chonostegites tabulatus
 †Cincinnaticrinus
  †Cincinnetina
 †Cincinnetina meeki
 †Cincinnetina multisecta
 †Cingularia
 †Cingulizonates
 †Cingulizonates loricatus
 †Cirratriradites
 †Cirratriradites annulatus
 †Cirratriradites annuliformis
  †Cladochonus
 †Cladochonus beecheri
 †Cladochonus crassus
 †Cladochonus longi
 †Cladopora
 †Cladopora acupicta
 †Cladopora bifurca
 †Cladopora gracilis – tentative report
 †Cladopora gulielmi
 †Cladopora imbricata – tentative report
 †Cladopora robusta – tentative report
 †Cladopora roemeri
 †Cladoxylon
 †Clathrodictyon
 †Clathrospira
 †Clathrospira subconica
 †Cleiodictya
 †Cleiodictya gloriosa
  †Cleiothyridina
 †Cleiothyridina hirsuta
 †Cleiothyridina obmaxima
 †Cleiothyridina parvirostra
 †Cleiothyridina pravirostra
 †Cleiothyridina sublamellosa
 †Cleodictya
 †Clepsidropsis
 †Clepsidropsis titan
 †Clepsydropsis
 †Clepsydropsis bertrandi
 †Clepsydropsis chaneyi
 †Clinopistha
 †Clinopistha exacutus
 †Cliotrypa
 †Clorinda – tentative report
 †Codonotheca
 †Codonotheca caduca
 †Coelocerododontus
 †Coelocerododontus biconvexus – or unidentified comparable form
 †Coelochilina
 †Coelochilina striatomarginata
 †Coeloclema
 †Coelospira
 †Coenites
 †Coenites brownsportensis
 †Coenites cryptodens – or unidentified comparable form
 †Coenites laqueata – or unidentified comparable form
 †Coenites rectilineatus
 †Coleophyllum
 †Coleophyllum romingeri
 †Columnaria
 †Columnaria alveolata
 †Columnaria vacua
 †Complexisporites
 †Complexisporites chalonerii
  †Composita
 †Composita globosa
 †Composita subquadrata
 †Composita sulcata
 †Composita trinuclea
 †Compressiphyllum
 †Compressiphyllum davisana
 †Concavicaris
 †Conchidium
 †Conchidium biolularis – or unidentified comparable form
 †Conchidium exporrecta
 †Conchidium laqueatum
 †Conchidium littoni – or unidentified comparable form
 †Conocardium
 †Conocardium richmondense – type locality for species
  †Constellaria
 †Constellaria limitaris
 †Constellaria polystomella
 †Conularia
 †Conularia formosa
 †Convolutipora
 †Convolutipora florida
 †Convolutispora
 †Convolutispora fromensis
 †Coolinia
 †Coolinia subplana
 †Cordaianthus
 †Cordaianthus gemmifer
 †Cordaicarpon – tentative report
  †Cordaites
 †Cordaites borassifolius
 †Cordaites crassinervis
 †Cordaites principalis
 †Cornulitella
  †Cornulites
 †Cornulites formosa
 †Cornulites proprius
 Cornuspira
 †Cornuspira semiconstrictus
 †Coronura
 †Coronura aspectans
 †Corynotrypa
 †Corynotrypa dissimilis
 †Costalocrinus
 †Costalocrinus rex
 †Costatulites
 †Costatulites richmondensis
 †Cranaena
 †Cranaena lincklaeni
 †Cranaena romingeri
 †Cranaena subcircularis
 †Cranaena sulcata
 †Cranaena sullivanti
  †Crania
 †Crania chesterensis
 †Craniops
 †Craniops hamiltonae
 †Craniops hamiltoniae
 †Crassispora
 †Crassispora kosankei
 †Crassispora plicata
 †Craterophyllum
 †Craterophyllum latiradium – tentative report
 †Craterophyllum magnificum
 †Cribanocrinus
 †Cribanocrinus coxanus
 †Cribroconcha – tentative report
 †Cristatisporites
 †Cristatisporites alpernii
 †Crossotheca
 †Crossotheca sagittata
  †Crotalocrinites
 †Crotalocrinus
 †Crotalocrinus cora
 †Crurithyris
 †Crurithyris parva
 †Cryptonella
 †Cryptonella lens
 †Cryptonella ovalis
 †Crytobairdia
 †Crytobairdia compacta
 †Ctenocrinus
 †Ctenocrinus granulosus
 †Ctenodonta
 †Ctenodonta iphegenia
 †Ctenodonta madisonensis
 †Cuffeyella
 †Cuffeyella arachnoidea
 †Cunctocrinus
 †Cunctocrinus fortunatus
 †Cuneamya
 †Cuneamya miamiensis
 †Cupularostrum
 †Cupularostrum exima
 †Cupulocorona
 †Cupulocorona gemmiformis
 †Cupulocorona hammeli
 †Cupulocorona osgoodensis
 †Cupulocrinus
 †Cupulocrinus gemmiformis
 †Cyathaxonia
 †Cyathaxonia cyndon
 †Cyathaxonia tantilla
  †Cyathocrinites
 †Cyathocrinites glenni – or unidentified comparable form
 †Cyathocrinites multibrachiatus
 †Cyathocrinites parvibrachiatus
 †Cyathocrinites pauli
 †Cyathocrinites sanduskyensis
 †Cyathocrinites striatissimus
 †Cyathocrinites wilsoni
 †Cyathophyllum – tentative report
 †Cycloconcha
 †Cycloconcha milleri
 †Cyclocyclopa
 †Cyclogranisporites
 †Cyclogranisporites aureus
 †Cyclogranisporites breviradiatus
 †Cyclogranisporites microgranus
 †Cyclogranisporites minutus
 †Cyclogranisporites obliquus
 †Cyclogranisporites orbicularis
 †Cyclogranisporites staplini
 †Cycloholcus
 †Cyclonema
 †Cyclonema bilix
 †Cyclonema daytonensis
 †Cyclonema gyronemoides
 †Cyclonema type locality for species – informal
 †Cyclopentagonopa
  †Cyclopteris
 †Cyclopteris orbicularis
 †Cyclopteris trichomanoides
 †Cyclospongia
 †Cyclospongia discus
 †Cyclotrypa
 †Cylicocrinus
 †Cylicocrinus canaliculatus
 †Cylicocrinus indianensis
 †Cylicocrinus spinosus
 †Cylindrophyllum
 †Cylindrophyllum compactum
 †Cymatonota
 †Cymatonota recta
 †Cymatonota suberecta
  †Cyphaspis
 †Cyphaspis christyi
 †Cyphocrinus
 †Cyphocrinus gorbyi
 †Cyphotrypa
 †Cyphotrypa osgoodensis
 †Cypricardinia
 †Cypricardinia indenta
 †Cypricardinia scitula
 †Cyrtia
 †Cyrtia exporrecta
 †Cyrtina
 †Cyrtina burlingtonensis
 †Cyrtina hamiltonensis
 †Cyrtocerina
 †Cyrtocerina carinifera
 †Cyrtocerina madisonensis
 †Cyrtocerina modesta
 †Cyrtocerina patella
 †Cyrtodontula
 †Cyrtodontula sterlingensis
 †Cyrtolites
 †Cyrtolites hornyi
 †Cyrtolites ornatus
 †Cyrtolites sinuosus
  †Cyrtospirifer
 †Cyrtospirifer latior
 †Cystelasma
 †Cystihalysites
 †Cystihalysites magnituba
 †Cystiphylloides
 †Cystiphylloides americanum
 †Cystiphylloides cicatriciferum
 †Cystiphylloides hispidum
 †Cystiphylloides infundibuliformis
 †Cystiphylloides nanum
 †Cystiphylloides plicatum
 †Cystiphylloides pustulatum
 †Cystiphylloides quadrangulare
 †Cystiphylloides squamosum
 †Cystiphylloides tenuiradium
 †Cystiphyllum
 †Cystodictya
 †Cystodictya lineata
 †Cytocrinus

D

 †Dalejina
 †Dalejina euorthis
 †Dalejina hybrida
 †Dalejina newsomensis
   †Dalmanites
 †Dalmanites halli
 †Dalmanites limulurus
 †Danaea
 †Danaea meccaensis
 †Dawsonoceras
 †Dawsonoceras americanum
 †Dawsonoceras annulatum
  †Decadocrinus
 †Decadocrinus depressus
 †Decadocrinus stellatus – type locality for species
 †Decadorinus
 †Decaschisma
 †Decaschisma pulchellum
 †Decatocrinus
 †Deceptrix
 †Deceptrix albertina
 †Deceptrix decipiens – tentative report
 †Dechenella
 †Dechenella boteroi
 †Dechenella lucasensis
 †Decoroproetus
 †Delicaster
 †Delicaster enigmaticus
 †Dellea
 †Delthyris
 †Delthyris clarksvillensis
 †Deltoidospora
 †Deltoidospora grandis
 †Deltoidospora sphaerotriangula
 †Dendrina – tentative report
 †Dendrocrinus
 †Densosporites
 †Densosporites annulatus
 †Densosporites irregularis
 †Densosporites sphaerotriangularis
 †Densosporites spinifer
 †Densosporites triangularis
 †Desmacriocrinus
 †Desmacriocrinus moreyi
 †Desmidocrinus
 †Desmidocrinus dubius
 †Desmidocrinus laurelianus
 †Devonochonetes
 †Devonochonetes coronatus
 †Devonochonetes fragilis
 †Devonochonetes fragilus
 †Devonochonetes scitulus
 †Diabolirhynchia
 †Diabolirhynchia acinus
 †Diabolorhynchia
 †Diabolorhynchia acinus
 †Diaphorodendron
 †Diaphragmus
 †Diaphragmus fasciculatus
 †Dichocrinus
 †Dichocrinus ficus
 †Dichocrinus simplex
 †Dichocrinus striatus
 †Dichocrinus ulrichi
 †Dichostreblocrinus – type locality for genus
 †Dichostreblocrinus scrobiculus – type locality for species
 †Dicksonites – tentative report
 †Dicksonites pluckeneti
 †Dicoelosia
 †Dicoelosia bilobata
 †Diconularia
 †Dictyoclostus
 †Dictyoclostus inflatus
 †Dictyonema
 †Dictyospongia – tentative report
 †Diedrorynchus
 †Diedrorynchus conalatum
 †Dielasma
 †Dielasma arkansana
 †Dielasma crawfordsvillensis
 †Dielasma crowfordsvillensis
 †Dielasma illinoisense
 †Dielasmella
 †Dielasmella compressa
 †Diestoceras
 †Diestoceras cyrtocerinoides
 †Diestoceras eos
 †Diestoceras indianense
 †Diestoceras pupa
 †Diestoceras reversum – tentative report
 †Diestoceras shideleri
 †Diestoceras shiderleri
 †Diestoceras vasiforme
 †Diestoceras waynesvillense – type locality for species
 †Dimegelasma
 †Dimerocrinites
 †Dimerocrinites carleyi
 †Dimerocrinites inornatus
 †Dimerocrinites occidentalis
  †Dinicthys
 †Dinobolus
 †Dinobolus conradi – or unidentified comparable form
 †Diplochone
 †Diplochone greenei
 †Diplothmema
 †Diplothmema obtusiloba
 †Diplotrypa
 †Diplotrypa nummiformis
 †Disphyllum
 †Disphyllum cohaerens
 †Disphyllum synaptophylloides – type locality for species
 †Ditoecholasma
 †Ditoecholasma acutiannulatum
  †Dizygocrinus
 †Dizygocrinus indianaensis
 †Dizygocrinus indianensis
 †Dizygocrinus venustus – or unidentified comparable form
 †Dizygocrinus whitei – or unidentified comparable form
 †Dolatocrinus
 †Dolatocrinus bellarugosus
 †Dolatocrinus bulbaceus
 †Dolatocrinus corporosus
 †Dolatocrinus greeni
 †Dolerorthis
 †Dolerorthis flabellites
 †Dolerorthis interplicata
 †Dorycrinus
 †Dorycrinus gouldi
 †Douvillina
 †Douvillina inaequistriata
 †Drabia – tentative report
  †Drepanopterus
 †Drymopora
 †Drymopora fascicularis
 †Drymopora frutectosa
 †Drymopora jacksoni
 †Drymopora procumbens
 †Duncanella
 †Duncanella borealis
 †Dyscritella
 †Dystactospongia
 †Dystactospongia madisonensis

E

 †Ecclimadictyon
 †Ecclimadictyon fastigiatum – or unidentified comparable form
 †Echinoconchus
 †Echinoconchus alternatus
 †Echinoconchus biseriatus
 †Edaphophyllum
 †Edaphophyllum bifurcatum
 †Edaphophyllum bipartitum
   †Edestus
 †Edestus heinrichi
 †Edmondia
 †Edmondia varsoviensis
 †Elasmonema
 †Elasmonema bellatula
 †Elaterites
 †Elaterites triferens
  †Eldredgeops
 †Eldredgeops rana
 †Elita
 †Elita fimbriata
 †Elvinia
 †Elytron
 †Elytron elimatus
 †Emmonsia
 †Emmonsia amplissima
 †Emmonsia bacula
 †Emmonsia convexa
 †Emmonsia cymosa
 †Emmonsia emmonsi
 †Emmonsia epidermata
 †Emmonsia eximia
 †Emmonsia radiciformis
 †Emmonsia ramosa
 †Emmonsia tuberosa
 †Emperocrinus
 †Emperocrinus indianensis
  †Encrinurus
 †Encrinurus indianaensis
 †Endosporites
 †Endosporites globiformis
 †Endosporites plicatus
 †Enterolasma
 †Enterolasma caliculum
 †Eocaudia
 Eocaudina
 †Eocaudina marginata
 †Eocaudina mccormacki
 †Eochonetes
 †Eochonetes clarksvillensis
 †Eodictyonella (formerly Dictyonella)
 †Eodictyonella coralifera – or unidentified comparable form
 †Eodictyonella reticulata
 †Eohalysiocrinus
 †Eohalysiocrinus stigmatus
 †Eoparisocrinus
 †Eoparisocrinus siluricus
 †Eoplectodonta
 †Eoplectodonta prolongatus
 †Eoplectodonta transversalis
 †Eoplicanoplia
 †Eospinatrypa
 †Eospinatrypa nodostriata
 †Eospirifer
 †Eospirifer eudora
 †Eospirifer foggi
 †Eospirifer niagarensis
 †Eospirifer radiatus
 †Eotomaria
 †Eotomaria laphami
 †Eotomaria trochoides – type locality for species
 †Eotrochus
 †Eotrochus tenuimarginatus – type locality for species
 †Eratocrinus
 †Eratocrinus salemensis
  †Eretmocrinus
 †Eretmocrinus cassedayanus – tentative report
 †Eretmocrinus magnificus
 †Eridophyllum
 †Eridophyllum apertum
 †Eridophyllum archiaci
 †Eridophyllum coagulatum
 †Eridophyllum conjunctum
 †Eridophyllum seriale
 †Eridopora
 †Eridopora macrostoma
 †Eridorthis
 †Eridorthis nicklesi
  †Erieopterus
 †Erieopterus limuloides
   †Eucalyptocrinites
 †Eucalyptocrinites caelatus
 †Eucalyptocrinites crassus
 †Eucalyptocrinites tuberculatus
 †Eucheirocrinus
 †Eucheirocrinus indianensis
 †Euchondria
 †Euchondria grandis – tentative report
 †Euconospira
 †Euconospira conula – type locality for species
 †Euconospira elegantula – type locality for species
 †Eugeneodus – type locality for genus
 †Eugeneodus richardsoni – type locality for species
 †Eumetria
 †Eumetria costata
 †Eumetria marcyi
 †Eumetria vera
 †Eumetria verneuiliana
 †Eumetria verneuliana
 †Eunella
 †Eunella harmonia
 †Eunema
 †Eunema helicteres
 †Eunicites
 †Euomphalopterus
 †Euomphalopterus alatus
 †Eupachycrinus
 †Eupachycrinus boydii
 †Eurychilina
 †Eurychilina striatomarginata
 †Eusphenopteris
 †Euthyrhachis
 †Euthyrhachis indianense
 †Eutrophoceras

F

 †Fabalicypris
 †Fardenia
 †Fardenia subplana
   †Favosites
 †Favosites arbor
 †Favosites baculus
 †Favosites biloculi
 †Favosites clelandi
 †Favosites cristatus
 †Favosites discoideus
 †Favosites favosus
 †Favosites forbesi
 †Favosites forbsei
 †Favosites goodwini
 †Favosites hisingeri
 †Favosites hispidus – or unidentified comparable form
 †Favosites impeditus
 †Favosites mundus
 †Favosites niagarensis
 †Favosites occidentalis
 †Favosites patellatus – type locality for species
 †Favosites pirum
 †Favosites placentus
 †Favosites proximatus
 †Favosites quercus
 †Favosites ramulosus
 †Favosites rotundituba
 †Favosites spinigerus
 †Favosites turbinatus
 †Fayettoceras
 †Fayettoceras thompsoni
  †Fenestella
 †Fenestella burlingtonensis
 †Fenestella cestriensis
 †Fenestella exigua
 †Fenestella matheri
 †Fenestralia
 †Ferganella
 †Fimbrispirifer
 †Fimbrispirifer divaricatus
 †Fimbrispirifer venustus
 †Finitiporus
 †Finitiporus boardmani
 †Fistulipora
 †Fistulipora compressa
 †Fistulipora compressus
 †Fistulipora excellens
 †Fistulipora incrustans
 †Fistulipora perdensa
 †Fistulipora promiscua
 †Fistulipora spergenensis
 †Fletcheria
 †Flexaria
 †Flexaria annosa – or unidentified related form
 †Flexaria floydensis
  †Flexicalymene
 †Flexicalymene meeki
 †Florinites
 †Florinites antiquus
 †Florinites millotti
 †Florinites similis
 †Florinites visendus
 †Florinites volans
 †Floweria
 †Floweria chemungensis

G

 †Gattendorfia
 †Gattendorfia alteri – type locality for species
 †Gazacrinus
 †Gazacrinus depressus
 †Gazacrinus inornatus
 †Gazacrinus magnus
 †Gazacrinus ventricosus
 †Gennaeocrinus
 †Gennaeocrinus carinatus
 †Gigantopteris
 †Gigantopteris dawsoni
  †Gilbertsocrinus
 †Gilbertsocrinus tuberosus
 †Gilliodus
 †Gilliodus orvillei – type locality for species
 †Gilliodus peyeri – type locality for species
 †Girtyella
 †Girtyella brevilobata
 †Girtyella indianensis
 †Girtyspira
 †Girtyspira canaliculata – type locality for species
 †Gissocrinus
 †Glabrocingulum
  †Glikmanius
 †Glikmanius occidentalis
 Glomospira
 †Glomospira articulosa
 †Glyphodeta
 †Glyphodeta terebriformis – type locality for species
  †Glyptambon
 †Glyptambon verrucosus
 †Glyptaster
  †Glyptocrinus
 †Glyptodesma
 †Glyptopora
 †Glyptorthis
 †Glyptorthis insculpta
  †Gomphoceras
 †Gomphoceras projectum
 †Gomphoceras wabashense
 †Gomphocystites
 †Gomphocystites indianensis
 †Gorbyoceras
 †Gorbyoceras crossi
 †Gorbyoceras duncanae
 †Gorbyoceras gorbyi
 †Gorbyoceras hammelli
 †Gosseletina
 †Gosseletina subglobosa – type locality for species
 †Granasporites
 †Granasporites medius
 †Granatocrinus
 †Granatocrinus granulosus – tentative report
 †Granulatisporites
 †Granulatisporites granularis
 †Granulatisporites minutus
 †Granulatisporites pallidus
 †Granulatisporites parvus – or unidentified comparable form
 †Granulatisporites tuberculatus
 †Graphiadactyllis
 †Graphiadactyllis fayettevillensis
 †Graphiadactyllis fernglenesis
 †Graphiadactyllis granopunctatus
 †Graphiadactylloides
 †Graphiadactylloides imopmemsos
 †Graphiadactylloides lineatus – or unidentified related form
 †Graphiadactylloides moridgei
 †Graphiadactylloides unionensis
 †Graphiadactylus
 †Graphosterigma
 †Graphosterigma grammodes
 †Graptodictya
  †Greenops
 †Greenops chilmanae
 †Greenops pleione
  †Grewingkia
 †Grewingkia canadensis
 †Grewingkia rusticum
 †Griffithidella
 †Griffithidella doris
 †Griffithidella welleri
 †Gypidula
 †Gypidula nucleus

H

 †Hadroblastus
 †Hadrophyllum
 †Hadrophyllum nettelrothi
 †Hadrophyllum orbignyi
   †Hallopora
 †Hallopora elegantula
 †Hallopora subnodosa
 †Halysiocrinus
 †Halysiocrinus tunicatus
   †Halysites
 †Halysites catenularia
 †Halysites labyrinthicus
 †Halysites microporus
 †Hamburgia
 †Haplistion
 †Haplistion armstrongi
 †Hapsiphyllum
 †Hapsiphyllum cassedayi
 †Harpidella
 †Harpidella christyi
 †Harpidium – tentative report
 †Healdia
 †Hebertella
 †Hebertella alveata
 †Hebertella occidentalis
 †Hebertella sinuata
 †Hebertella subjugata
 †Hedeina
 †Hedeina eudora
 †Hederella
 †Hederella alpenensis
 †Hederella delicatula
 †Hederella filiformis
 †Hederella thedfordensis
 †Helicotoma
 †Helicotoma marginata
 †Heliolites
 †Heliolites megastoma
  †Heliophyllum
 †Heliophyllum agassizi
 †Heliophyllum denticulatum
 †Heliophyllum halli
 †Heliophyllum incrassatum
 †Heliophyllum latericrescens
 †Heliophyllum venatum
 †Heliophyllum verticale
 †Helodus
 †Helodus incisus
 †Helopora
 †Helopora inexpectata
 †Hemitrypa
 †Hennigopora
 †Hennigopora apta
 †Heslerodus
 †Heslerodus divergens
 †Hesperorthis
 †Heteralosia
 †Heteralosia keokuk
 †Heterangium
 †Heterophrentis
 †Heterophrentis annulata
 †Heterophrentis cyathiformis
 †Heterophrentis duplicata
 †Heterophrentis inflata
 †Heterophrentis irregularis
 †Heterophrentis nitida – tentative report
 †Heterophrentis ovalis
 †Heterophrentis prolifica
 †Heterophrentis rafinesqui
 †Heterophrentis simplex
 †Heterophrentis trisutura
 †Heterotrypa
 †Heterotrypa microstigma
 †Heterotrypa perplexa
 †Heterotrypa prolifica
 †Heterotrypa singularis
 †Heterotrypa subramosa
  †Hexagonaria
 †Hexagonaria bella
 †Hexagonaria cincta
 †Hexagonaria curta
 †Hexagonaria ovoidea
 †Hexagonaria partita
 †Hexagonaria ponderosa
 †Hexagonaria prisma
 †Hexameroceras
 †Hexameroceras cacabiforme
 †Hexameroceras delphicolum
 †Hindella – tentative report
 †Hindia
 †Hippocardia
 †Hippocardia ohioense
 †Hirneacrinus
 †Hirneacrinus cupellaeformis – type locality for species
 †Hirneacrinus perplanus – type locality for species
 †Hiscobeccus
 †Hiscobeccus capax
 †Histocrinus
 †Histocrinus coreyi
 †Histocrinus grandis
 †Histocrinus graphicus
 †Hizemodendron
 †Hizemodendron serratum
 †Hoareicardia
 †Hoareicardia cunea
 †Holcocrinus
 †Holcocrinus nodobrachiatus
 †Holcospermum
 †Holocystites
 †Holocystites abnormalis
 †Holocystites abnormis
 †Holocystites alternatus
 †Holocystites clavus
 †Holocystites faberi – or unidentified comparable form
 †Holocystites ornatus
 †Holocystites ovatus
 †Holocystites parvulus
 †Holocystites perlongus
 †Holocystites scutellatus
 †Holocystites spangleri
 †Holocystites splendens
  †Holopea
 †Holopea ampla
 †Holtedahlina
 †Holtedahlina sulcata
 †Homalophyllum
 †Homalophyllum fusiformis
 †Homalophyllum herzeri
 †Homalophyllum ungulum
 †Homocrinus
 †Homoeospira
 †Homoeospira evax
 †Homotrypa
 †Homotrypa alta – or unidentified related form
 †Homotrypa austini – or unidentified comparable form
 †Homotrypa communis
 †Homotrypa flabellaris
 †Homotrypa gelasinosa
 †Homotrypa nodulosa – or unidentified comparable form
 †Homotrypa richmondensis
 †Homotrypa wortheni
 †Homotrypella
 †Hondichnus
 †Hondichnus monroensis
 †Hormotoma
 †Hormotoma gracilis
 †Howellella
 †Howellella crispa
 †Howellella crispus
 †Hydnoangulus – type locality for genus
 †Hydnoangulus quadratus – type locality for species
 †Hydriodictya – tentative report
 †Hydriodictya cyclix
 †Hylodecrinus
 †Hylodecrinus sculptus
 
  †Hyolithes
 †Hyolithes monroensis
 Hyperammina
 †Hyperammina bulbosa
 †Hyperammina casteri
 †Hyperammina constricta
 †Hyperammina gracilenta
 †Hyperammina kentuckyensis
 †Hyperammina rockfordensis
 †Hypergonia
 †Hypergonia attenuata – type locality for species
 †Hypergonia turritella – type locality for species
 †Hypergonia vermicula – type locality for species
 †Hypselocrinus
 †Hypselocrinus hoveyi
 †Hypselocrinus indianensis

I

 †Ichthyorachis
 †Icriodus
 †Icriodus latericrescens
 †Icthyocrinus
 †Icthyocrinus corbis
 †Icthyocrinus subangularis
 †Ildraites
 †Ildraites howelli
 †Illaenoides
  †Illaenus
 †Imbrexia
 †Imbrexia forbesi
 †Imbrexia montgomeryensis
 †Imbrexia mortonana
 †Imitoceras
 †Imitoceras rotatorium
 †Iniopera – type locality for genus
 †Iniopera richardsoni – type locality for species
  †Iniopteryx
 †Iniopteryx rushlaui
 †Inocaulis
 †Intrapora
 †Intrapora irregularis
  †Iocrinus
 †Ischadites
 †Ischadites subturbinatus
 †Ischadites tenuis
 †Ischyrodonta
 †Ischyrodonta decipiens
 †Ischyrodonta ovalis
 †Ischyrodonta truncata
 †Isobuthus
 †Isobuthus pottsvillensis – type locality for species
 †Isochilina
 †Isochilina subnodosa
 †Isorthis
 †Isorthis arcuaria – or unidentified related form
  †Isotelus
 †Isotelus gigas
 †Isotelus maximus

K

 †Kallimorphocrinus – type locality for genus
 †Kallimorphocrinus astrus – type locality for species
 †Kalymma
 †Kalymma lirata
 †Karinopteris
 †Kaskia
 †Kaskia chesterensis
 †Kindbladia
 †Kindleoceras
 †Kindleoceras cumingsi
 †Kindleoceras equilaterale
 †Kindleoceras rotundum
 †Kingstonia
 †Kionelasma
 †Kionelasma coarticum
 †Kionelasma conspicuum
 †Kionelasma mammiferum
  †Kionoceras
 †Kionoceras bellense – or unidentified comparable form
 †Kionoceras cancellatum
 †Kionoceras delphiense
 †Kirkbya
 †Kirkbya fernglenensis
 †Kirkbya keiferi
 †Kirkbyella
 †Kirkbyella annensis
 †Kirkidium
 †Kirkidium knighti – or unidentified comparable form
 †Kirkidium laqueatum
 †Knightites
 †Knoxina
 †Knoxisporites
 †Knoxisporites rotatus
 †Knoxisporites triradiatus
 †Kodonophyllum
 †Kodonophyllum mulleri – or unidentified comparable form
  †Kokomopterus
 †Kokomopterus longicaudatus
 †Kosovopeltis

L

 †Labechia
 †Laevigatosporites
 †Laevigatosporites desmoinensis
 †Laevigatosporites desmoinesensis
 †Laevigatosporites globosus
 †Laevigatosporites medius
 †Laevigatosporites minutus
 †Laevigatosporites ovalis
 †Laevigatosporites punctatus
 †Laevigatosporites vulgaris
 †Lambeoceras
 †Lambeoceras richmondense
 †Lampadosocrinus
 †Lampadosocrinus minutus
 †Langepis
 †Langepis campbelli – type locality for species
 †Laurelocrinus
 †Laurelocrinus gibbosus
 †Laurelocrinus paulensis
 †Laurelocrinus spinoradialis
 †Laurelocrinus wilsoni
 †Leangella
 †Lebedictya
 †Lebedictya crinita
 †Lebetocrinus
 †Lebetocrinus grandis
 †Lecanocrinus
 †Lecanocrinus elongatus
 †Lecanocrinus pusillus
 †Lechritochoceras
 †Lechritochoceras desplainense
 †Lecythiocrinus – tentative report
 †Leiorhynchus
 †Leiorhynchus limitare
 †Leiorhynchus quadricostatum
 †Leiotriletes
 †Leiotriletes adnatoides
 †Leiotriletes levis
 †Leiotriletes notatus
 †Leodicites
 †Leodicites imparilis – or unidentified related form
 †Leodicites variedentatus
 †Lepadocystis
 †Leperditia
 †Leperditia caecigena
 †Leperditia caecigenia
 †Lepetopsis
 †Lepetopsis levettei – type locality for species
 †Lepidocarpon
 †Lepidocyclus
 †Lepidocyclus perlamellosum
     †Lepidodendron
 †Lepidodendron aculeatum
 †Lepidodendron baylense
 †Lepidodendron dichotomum
 †Lepidodendron hickii
 †Lepidodendron lanceolatum – tentative report
 †Lepidodendron latifolium
 †Lepidodendron modulatum
 †Lepidodendron obovatum
 †Lepidodendron ophiurus
 †Lepidodendron vestitum
 †Lepidodendron wortheni
 †Lepidophloios
 †Lepidophloios hallii
 †Lepidophloios laricinus – or unidentified comparable form
 †Lepidophyllum
 †Lepidophyllum longifolium
 †Lepidostrobophyllum
 †Lepidostrobophyllum affine
 †Lepidostrobophyllum ovatifolius
 †Lepidostrobophyllum princeps – or unidentified comparable form
 †Lepidostrobus
 †Lepidostrobus incertus – or unidentified comparable form
 †Lepidostrobus variabilis
 †Leptaena
 †Leptaena convexa
 †Leptaena gibbosa
 †Leptaena rhomboidalis
 †Leptaena richmondensis
 †Leptoconocardium
 †Leptoconocardium catastomum – type locality for species
 †Leptodesma
 †Leptodesma rogersi
 †Leptotrypella
 †Leptotrypella ohioensis
 †Lesueurilla
 †Lesueurilla beloitensis
 †Lichas
 †Lichas breviceps
 †Lichenalia
 †Liljevallospira
 †Limoptera
  †Lingula
 †Lingula otheri
 †Lingula spatulata
 †Lingulops
 †Linoproductus
 †Linoproductus altonensis
 †Linoproductus pileiformis
 †Linopteris
 †Liospira
 †Liospira micula
 †Liospira obtusa
 †Liospira vitruvia
 †Lissatrypa
 †Litocrinus
 †Llanoaspis – tentative report
 †Lobatopteris
 †Lobatopteris vestita – or unidentified comparable form
 †Lobomelocrinus
 †Lobomelocrinus obconicus
 †Lophoblastus
 †Lophoblastus inopinatus – or unidentified comparable form
 †Lophospira
 †Lophospira milleri
 †Lophospira perangulata
 †Lophospira serrulata
 †Lophospira ventricosa
 †Lophotriletes
 †Lophotriletes commissuralis
 †Lophotriletes pseudaculeatus
 †Lophotriletes rarispinosus
 †Loxonema
 †Lumbriconerites
 †Lumectaster
 †Lumectaster howelli
 †Lunulazona – tentative report
 †Lunulazona springeri
 †Lycospora
 †Lycospora granulata
 †Lycospora micropapillata
 †Lycospora noctuina
 †Lycospora orbicula
 †Lycospora paulula
 †Lycospora pellucida
 †Lycospora punctata
 †Lycospora pusilla
 †Lycospora rotunda
 †Lycospora subjuga
 †Lyginorachis
 †Lyginorachis dineuroides
 †Lyriocrinus
 †Lyriocrinus melissa
 †Lyrodesma
 †Lyrodesma major
 †Lyropora
 †Lyropora devonica
 †Lyroporella
 †Lyroporella divergens
 †Lysocystites
 †Lysocystites sculptus
 †Lytospira
 †Lytospira undulatus

M

 †Macrocrinus
 †Macrocrinus mundulus – tentative report
 †Macrocrinus strotobasilaris
 †Macrocrinus strotobasilarsis
 Macrocypris – tentative report
 †Macrostachya
 †Macrostachya infundibuliformis
 †Macrostylocrinus
 †Macrostylocrinus fasciatus
 †Macrostylocrinus striatus
 †Manicrinus
 †Manicrinus erectus
 †Manicrinus hybocriniformis
 †Manitoulinoceras
 †Manitoulinoceras erraticum
 †Manitoulinoceras gyroforme
 †Manitoulinoceras moderatum
 †Marginatia
 †Marginatia burlingtonensis
 †Marginatia crawfordsvillensis
 †Marginirugus
 †Marginirugus magnus
 †Mariopteris
 †Mariopteris hymenophylloides – tentative report
 †Mariopteris mazoniana
 †Mariopteris muricata
 †Mariopteris nervosa
 †Marsupiocrinus
 †Marsupiocrinus laurelensis
 †Marsupiocrinus pauciornatus
 †Marsupiocrinus turbinatus
 †Martinia
 †Martinia contracta
 †Maurotarion
 †Maurotarion christi
 †Mediospirifer
 †Mediospirifer audaculus
 †Medullosa
 †Meekopora
 †Meekopora eximia
 †Megakozlowskiella
 †Megakozlowskiella sculptilis
 †Megalomphala
 †Megalomphala crassa
 †Megalomus
 †Megalomus canadensis
 †Megastrophia
 †Megastrophia concava
 †Megastrophia profunda
 †Megistocrinus
 †Megistocrinus expansus
 †Melocrinites
 †Melocrinites aequalis
 †Melocrinites oblongus
 †Melonechinus
 †Mendacella
 †Mendacella circulus
 †Meniscophyllum
 †Meniscophyllum minutum
 †Menoeidina
 †Merista
 †Merista nitida
  †Meristella
 †Meristella nasuta
 †Meristina
 †Meristina maria
 †Meristina rectirostra
 †Meristina rectirostris
 †Merocanites
 †Mesocyridira
 †Mesocyridira bifurcata
 †Mesocyridira flagrocosta
 †Mesocyridira keokuk
 †Mesocyridira pallaensis – or unidentified related form
 †Mesocyridira pellaensis – or unidentified related form
 †Mesocyridira washingtonensis
 †Mesoleptostrophia
 †Mesoneuron
 †Mesoneuron simplex
 †Mesotrypa
 †Metriophyllum
 †Metriophyllum deminutivum
 †Miamoceras
 †Miamoceras shideleri
 †Michelinia
 †Michelinia manucus
 †Microantyx
 †Microantyx botoni – type locality for species
 †Microcheilinella
 †Microcheilinella spinosa
 †Microplasma
 †Microreticulatisporites
 †Microreticulatisporites nobilis
 †Microreticulatisporites sulcatus
 †Mirocheilinella
 †Mixoneura – tentative report
 †Mixoneura jenneyi
 †Modiolopsis
 †Modiolopsis concentrica – tentative report
 †Modiolopsis modiolaris
 †Modiolopsis versaillesensis
 †Modiomorpha
 †Modiomorpha concentrica
 †Monodechenella
 †Monodechenella macrocephala
 †Monomorella
 †Monotrypa
 †Monotrypa benjamini
 †Monotrypa exserta
 †Monotrypella
 †Monotrypella aequalis
 †Mooreisporites
 †Mooreisporites inusitatus
 †Mooreoceras
 †Mooreoceras chouteauense
 †Mooreoceras indianense
 †Mourlonia
 †Mucophyllum
    †Mucrospirifer
 †Mucrospirifer mucronatus
 †Mucrospirifer profundus
 †Mucrospirifer prolificus
 †Muensteroceras
 †Muensteroceras oweni
 †Muensteroceras parallelum
 †Mulceodens
 †Mulceodens jaanussoni – or unidentified comparable form
 †Murchisonia
 †Murchisonia laphami
 †Murchisonia subulata
 †Murchisonia vincta – type locality for species
 †Murchisonida
 †Myalina
 †Myalina keokuk
 †Myelodactylus
 †Myelodactylus ammonis
 †Myelodactylus convolutus
 †Mysticocrinus

N

  †Natica
 †Natica littonana – type locality for species
 †Naticonema
  †Naticopsis
 †Naticopsis carleyana – type locality for species
 †Naticopsis plebeia
 †Navispira
 †Navispira kennethensis
 †Neilsonia
 †Neilsonia insculpta – type locality for species
 †Nematopora
 †Neolageniocrinus
 †Neolageniocrinus cassidus – type locality for species
 †Neopalaeaster
 †Neopalaeaster crawfordsvillensis
 †Neozaphrentis
 †Nereidavis
   †Neuropteris
 †Neuropteris fimbriata
 †Neuropteris flexuosa
 †Neuropteris heterophylla
 †Neuropteris macrophylla
 †Neuropteris obliqua
 †Neuropteris ovata
 †Neuropteris rarinervis
 †Neuropteris scheuchzeri
 †Neuropteris tenuifolia
 †Neuropteris violetta
 †Nicklesopora
 †Nikiforovella
 †Nipterocrinus
 †Nipterocrinus monroensis
 †Nucleocrinus
 †Nucleocrinus angularis
 †Nucleospira
 †Nucleospira concentrica – or unidentified comparable form
 †Nucleospira concinna
 †Nucleospira pisiformis
 †Nucleospira rowleyi – or unidentified related form
 †Nucularca
 †Nucularca cingulata
 †Nuculites
 †Nuculopsis
 †Nuculopsis hians

O

 †Odontophyllum
 †Odontophyllum convergens
  †Odontopleura – tentative report
 †Odontopteris
 †Odontopteris subcuneata
 †Ohiocrinus
 †Ohiocrinus brauni
 †Oligocarpia
 †Oligocarpia missouriensis
 †Omospira
 †Omospira alexandra – or unidentified comparable form
 †Omphalophloios
 †Omphalophloios wagneri – type locality for species
 †Oncoceras
 †Oncoceras anomalum
 †Oncoceras duncanae
 †Oncoceras exile
 †Oncoceras insuetum
 †Onniella
 †Onniella macerata
 †Onychaster
 †Onychaster flexilis
  †Onychocrinus
 †Onychocrinus exculptus
 †Onychocrinus exsculptus
 †Onychocrinus pulaskiensis
 †Onychocrinus ramulosus
 †Onychopterella
 †Onychopterella kokomoensis
 †Oonoceras
 †Oonoceras fennemani
 †Oonoceras rejuvenatum
 †Oonoceras shideleri
 †Ophiletina
 †Ophiletina sublaxa
 †Opisthoptera
 †Opisthoptera casei
 †Orbiculoidea
 †Orbiculoidea keokuk
 †Orbiculoidea lodiensis
 †Oriostoma
 †Oriostoma globosum – or unidentified comparable form
 †Oriostoma hoyi
 †Ornithoprion – type locality for genus
 †Ornithoprion hertwigi – type locality for species
   †Orodus
 †Orodus greggi – type locality for species
 †Orodus micropterygius – type locality for species
 †Orthis
 †Orthis biforata
 †Orthis pyramidalis
 †Orthodesma
 †Orthodesma curvatum
 †Orthonybyoceras
 †Orthonybyoceras dyeri
 †Orthonychia
 †Orthonychia conicum
 †Orthopleura
 †Orthostrophia
 †Orthostrophia fissistriata
 †Orthotetes
 †Orthotetes kaskaskiensis
 †Orthotetes keokuk
 †Ortonella
 †Ortonella hainesi
 †Osgoodicystis
 †Osgoodicystis biessetti
 †Osgoodicystis cooperi
 †Osgoodicystis wykoffi
 †Otarion
 †Otarion niagarensis
 †Ovatia
 †Ovatia ovata – tentative report
 †Ovatia ovatus
 †Oxyprora
 †Oxyprora carinatum – type locality for species

P

 †Pachydictya
 †Pachydictya crassa
 †Pachylocrinus
 †Pachylocrinus aequalis
 †Pachylocrinus briareus
 †Pachylocrinus gibsoni
 †Pachytesta
 †Pachytesta vera – or unidentified comparable form
 †Palaeacis
 †Palaeacis enormis
 †Palaeocapulus
 †Palaeocapulus acutirostre
 †Palaeocapulus equilateralis
 †Palaeoconcha
 †Palaeoconcha faberi
 †Palaeoneilo
 †Palaeoneilo sulcatina
 †Palaeoneilo truncata
 †Palaeostachya
 †Palaeostachya elongata
 †Paleofavosites – tentative report
 †Paleofavosites prolificus
 †Paleospora
 †Paleospora fragila
 †Paleostachya
 †Paliphyllum
 †Paliphyllum suecicum brassfieldense
 †Palmatolepis
 †Palmatolepis linguiformis
 †Palmatolepis pseudofoliatus
 †Palmatolepis timorenis
 †Palmatopteris
 †Palmatopteris furcata
 †Paolia – type locality for genus
 †Paolia vetusta – type locality for species
 †Paoliola
 †Paoliola gurleyi – type locality for species
 †Paracolocrinus
 †Paracolocrinus paradoxicus
 †Paraconularia
 †Paraconularia chesterensis – tentative report
 †Paraconularia crawfordsvillensis
 †Paracyclas
 †Paracyclas occidentalis
 †Paracyclas proavia
 †Paradichocrinus
 †Paradichocrinus planus
 †Paradichocrinus polydactylus
 †Paragazacrinus
 †Paragazacrinus rotundus
 †Parallelodon
 †Parallelodon obsoletus – tentative report
 †Parallelodon tenuistriatus
 †Paralycopodites
 †Paralycopodites brevifolius
 †Paraparchites
   †Paraspirifer
 †Paraspirifer acuminatus
 †Parazyga
 †Parazyga hirsuta
 †Parichthyocrinus
 †Parichthyocrinus crawfordsvillensis
 †Parichthyocrinus meeki
 †Parisocrinus
 †Parisocrinus crawfordsvillensis
 †Parvohallopora
 †Parvohallopora ramosa
 †Passalocrinus
 †Passalocrinus triangularis
 †Patelliocrinus
 †Patelliocrinus indianensis
 †Patelliocrinus laevis
 †Patelliocrinus ornatus
 †Patelliocrinus rugosus
 †Paulicystis
 †Paulicystis densus
 †Paulicystis sparsus
 †Paulocrinus
 †Paulocrinus biturbinatus
 †Paupospira
 †Paupospira bowdeni
 †Paupospira moorei – type locality for species
 †Paupospira tropidophora
  †Pecopteris
 †Pecopteris cisti
 †Pecopteris clintoni
 †Pecopteris miltonii
 †Pecopteris polymorpha
 †Pecopteris pseudovestita – tentative report
 †Pecopteris serpillifolia – tentative report
 †Pecopteris squamosa
  †Pelagiella
 †Pellecrinus
 †Pellecrinus hexadactylus
 †Pemtremites
 †Pemtremites patei
 †Penniretepora
 †Pennsylvanioxylon
 †Pennsylvanioxylon nauertianum
 †Pentacystis
 †Pentacystis gibsoni
 †Pentacystis wykoffi
 †Pentagonia
 †Pentagonia biplicata
 †Pentamerella
 †Pentamerella arata
 †Pentamerella pavilionensis
 †Pentameroceras
 †Pentameroceras cumingsi
  †Pentamerus
 †Pentamerus fornicata
 †Pentamerus oblungus
 †Pentaramicrinus
 †Pentaramicrinus bimagnaramus
  †Pentremites
 †Pentremites abruptus
 †Pentremites angularis
 †Pentremites buttsi
 †Pentremites clavatus
 †Pentremites conoideus
 †Pentremites elegans
 †Pentremites girtyi
 †Pentremites halli
 †Pentremites hambachi
 †Pentremites maccalliei
 †Pentremites okawensis
 †Pentremites patei
 †Pentremites platybasis
 †Pentremites pyramidatus
 †Pentremites pyriformis
 †Pentremites robustus
 †Pentremites springeri
 †Pentremites symmetricus
 †Pentremites tulilpaformis
 †Pentremites tulipaformis
 †Pentremites welleri
 †Pentremitidea – tentative report
 †Pentremitidea approximata
 †Perditocardinia
 †Perditocardinia dubia
 †Periastron
 †Periastron perforatum
 †Periastron reticulatum
 †Pericyclus
 †Periechocrinites
  †Periechocrinus
 †Periechocrinus umbrosus
 †Peronopora
 †Peronopora decipiens
 †Petalocrinus
 †Petalocrinus inferior
 †Petalocrinus longus
 †Petigopora
 †Petrocrania
 †Petrocrania scabiosa
 †Phacelocrinus
 †Phacelocrinus longidactylus
  †Phacops
 †Phaenopora
 †Phaenopora ensiformis
 †Phaenoschisma
 †Phanocrinus
 †Phanocrinus formosus
 †Phanocrinus parvaramus
 †Phestia
 †Philhedra
 †Philhedra crenistriata
 †Philhedra laelia
 †Philhedra stewarti
 †Phillipsia
 †Phillipsia bufi
 †Phillipsia bufo
 †Phimocrinus – report made of unidentified related form or using admittedly obsolete nomenclature
 †Pholadomorpha
 †Pholadomorpha pholadiformis
 †Pholidops – report made of unidentified related form or using admittedly obsolete nomenclature
 †Pholidostrophia
 †Pholidostrophia iowaensis
 †Phosphannulus
 †Phractopora
 †Phragmoceras
 †Phragmoceras parvum
 †Phragmodictya
 †Phragmodictya catilliforme
 †Phragmolites
 †Phragmolites dyeri
 †Phragmolites triangularis
 †Phymatophyllum
 †Phymatophyllum multiplicatum
 †Physospongia
 †Physospongia colletti
 †Physospongia dawsoni
 †Pietzschia
 †Pietzschia polyupsilon
  †Pinna
 †Pinna subspatulata
   †Pinnularia
 †Pisocrinus
 †Pisocrinus benedicti – or unidentified comparable form
 †Pisocrinus campana
 †Pisocrinus gemmiformis
 †Pisocrinus gorbyi
 †Pisocrinus quinquelobus
  †Plaesiomys
 †Plaesiomys subquadrata
 †Plaesiomys subquatra
 †Planalvus – tentative report
 †Planalvus densa
 †Plasmopora
 †Plasmopora follis
 †Platyaxum
 †Platyaxum alicornis
 †Platyaxum foliatum
 †Platyaxum orthosoleniskum
 †Platyaxum undosum
   †Platyceras
 †Platyceras argo – tentative report
 †Platyceras brownsportense
 †Platyceras bucculentum
 †Platyceras clintonensis
 †Platyceras cornutum – or unidentified comparable form
 †Platyceras crassum
 †Platyceras daytonense
 †Platyceras echinatum
 †Platyceras erectum
 †Platyceras lineatum
 †Platyceras niagarense
 †Platyceras niagarensis
 †Platyceras plebium
  †Platycrinites
 †Platycrinites bonoensis
 †Platycrinites hemispericus
 †Platycrinites hemisphericus
 †Platycrinites nodostriatus
 †Platycrinites saffordi
 †Platycrinites safordi
 †Platycrinus
 †Platyrachella
 †Platyrachella macbridei
 †Platyrachella oweni
  †Platystrophia
 †Platystrophia acutilirata
 †Platystrophia annieana
 †Platystrophia attenuata
 †Platystrophia biforata – or unidentified comparable form
 †Platystrophia clarksvillensis
 †Platystrophia cummingsi
 †Platystrophia cypha
 †Platystrophia daytonensis
 †Platystrophia elkhornensis
 †Platystrophia foerstei
 †Platystrophia hopensis
 †Platystrophia laticosta
 †Platystrophia moritura
 †Platystrophia ponderosa
 †Platyzona
 †Platyzona trilineata – type locality for species
 †Pleapopleurus
 †Pleapopleurus tenuicostatus
 †Pleapopleurus tenuicostus
 †Pleapopluerus
 †Pleapopluerus tenuicostatus – tentative report
 †Plectatrypa
 †Plectodonta
 †Plectodonta elegantula
 †Plectodonta transversalis
 †Plectorthis
 †Plectorthis plicatella
 †Plectospira
 †Plectospira sexplicata
 †Plectospirifer
 †Pleurocornu
 †Pleurocornu amissum – or unidentified comparable form
  †Pleurodictyum
 †Pleurodictyum cornu
 †Pleurodictyum cylindricum
 †Pleurodictyum insigne
 †Pleurodictyum maximum
 †Pleurodictyum michelinoidea
 †Pleurodictyum papillosa
 †Pleurodictyum planum
 †Pleurodictyum speciosus
 †Pleurodictyum spiculata
 †Pleurodictyum wardi
 †Pleuronotus
 †Pleuronotus decewi
 †Pleurorthoceras
 †Pleurorthoceras clarksvillense
 †Poleumita
 †Poleumita scamnata
  †Polygnathus
 †Polypora
 †Polypora corticosa
 †Polypora multispinosa
 †Polypora nodolinearis
 †Polysacos – type locality for genus
 †Polysacos vickersianum – type locality for species
 †Polytryphocycloides
 †Polyxylon
 †Polyxylon elegans
 †Portlockiella
 †Poterioceras – tentative report
 †Poteriocrinites
 †Poteriocrinites amplus – type locality for species
 †Potonieisporites
 †Potonieisporites elegans
 †Prasopora
 †Prasopora hospitalis
 Priscopedatus
 †Prismopora
 †Prismopora serrulata
 †Pristiograptus
 †Pristiograptus jaegeri
 †Probillingsites
 Proboscina
 †Prodromites
 †Prodromites gorbyi
 †Productus
 †Productus cestriensis
 †Productus fasiculatus
  †Proetus
 †Proetus crassimarginatus
 †Proetus folliceps
 †Prolecanites
 †Prolecanites lyoni
 †Prolecythiocrinus
 †Prolecythiocrinus problematicus
 †Promexyele
 †Promexyele bairdi
 †Promexyele peyeri – type locality for species
 †Propora
 †Propora exigua
 †Prosolarium
 †Prosolarium crenulata
 †Protaraea
 †Protaraea richmondensis
 †Protatrypa
 †Protatrypa marginalis
 †Proteonina
 †Proteonina cumberlandiae
 †Protocalamites
 †Protocalamites dorfii
 †Protocanites
 †Protochonetes – tentative report
 †Protokoinoceras
 †Protokoinoceras medullare
 †Protolepidodendron
 †Protolepidodendron microphyllum
 †Protoleptostrophia
 †Protoleptostrophia perplana
 †Protomegastrophia
 †Protoniella
 †Protoniella parva – or unidentified related form
 †Protophragmoceras
 †Protophragmoceras hercules
   †Protosalvinia
 †Protosalvinia rarenna
 Psammosphaera
    †Psaronius
 †Pseudagnostus
 †Pseudastrorhiza
 †Pseudastrorhiza conica
 †Pseudaviculopecten
 †Pseudaviculopecten indianensis
 †Pseudoatrypa
 †Pseudoatrypa devoniana
 †Pseudobythocypris
 †Pseudocolpomya
 †Pseudocolpomya elongata
 †Pseudolingula
 †Pseudostrohiza
 †Pseudostrohiza delicata
 †Pseudosyrinx
 †Pseudosyrinx gigas
 †Pseudozygopleura
 †Pseudozygopleura yandellana – type locality for species
 †Psiloconcha
 †Psiloconcha grandis
 †Psilokirkbyella
 †Psilokirkbyella ozarkensis
    †Pteria
 †Pterinea
 †Pterinea brisa
 †Pterinea demissa
 †Pterinopecten
 †Pterinopecten hermes
 †Pterinopecten princeps
 †Pterocephalia
 †Pterotheca
 †Pterotheca expansa
 †Pterotheca intermedia – type locality for species
 †Pterotocrinus
 †Pterotocrinus acutus
 †Pterotocrinus armatus – or unidentified comparable form
 †Pterotocrinus bifurcatus
 †Pterotocrinus birfurcatus
 †Pterotocrinus convexus
 †Pterotocrinus depressus
 †Pterotocrinus lingulaformis
 †Pterotocrinus rugosus
 †Pterotocrinus spatulatus
    †Pterygotus
 †Pterygotus ventricosus
 †Ptychocarpus
 †Ptychocarpus unitus
 †Ptychopleurella
 †Ptylopora
 †Punctatisporites
 †Punctatisporites decorus
 †Punctatisporites flavus
 †Punctatisporites glaber
 †Punctatisporites incomptus
 †Punctatisporites minutus
 †Punctatisporites nahannensis
 †Punctatisporites obesus
 †Punctatisporites orbicularis
 †Punctatosporites
 †Punctatosporites minutus
 †Punctospirifer
 †Punctospirifer obtusus
 †Punctospirifer transversus
 †Pustulocystis
 †Pustulocystis ornatissimus
 †Pycnosaccus
 †Pycnosaccus laurelensis

Q

 †Quasillinites
 †Quasillinites diversiformis
 †Quasillites – tentative report
 †Quassilites

R

 †Rafinesquina
 †Rafinesquina alternata
 †Rafinesquina ponderosa
 †Raistrickia
 †Raistrickia breveminens
 †Raistrickia carbondalensis
 †Raistrickia crinita
 †Raistrickia crocea
 †Raistrickia lowellensis
 †Raistrickia subcrinita
 †Raistrickia superba
 †Raphistomina
 †Raphistomina modesta – or unidentified comparable form
 †Rasmussenoceras
 †Rasmussenoceras variable
 †Rectifenestella
 †Rectifenestella tenax
 †Rectobaidia
 †Rectobaidia fragosa – or unidentified related form
 †Reimannia
 †Reimannia indianensis
 †Renalcis – tentative report
 †Renaultia
 †Renaultia chaerophylloides
 Reophax
 †Reophax lachrymosa
 †Resserella
 †Resserella elegantula
 †Resserella waldronensis
 †Reticulariina
 †Reticulariina salemensis
 †Reticulariina spinosa
 †Reticulatisporites
 †Reticulatisporites polygonalis
 †Reticulatisporites reticulatus
 †Reticulitriletes
 †Reticulitriletes falsus
 †Reticulopteris
 †Reticulopteris muensteri
 †Retispira
 †Retispira textilis – type locality for species
 †Retoporina
 †Retoporina striata
 †Retrorsirostra
 †Retrorsirostra carleyi
 †Retzia
 †Retzia raricosta
 †Rhabdocarpus
 †Rhabdocarpus mamillatus
 †Rhabdocarpus mansfieldi – or unidentified comparable form
 †Rhabdocarpus multistriatus
 †Rhabdomeson
 †Rhadinichthys
 †Rhegmaphyllum – tentative report
 †Rhegmaphyllum daytonensis
 †Rhineoderma
 †Rhineoderma nodulostriata – type locality for species
 †Rhineoderma wortheni – type locality for species
 †Rhinidictya
 †Rhipdomella
 †Rhipdomella perminuta
 †Rhipidium
 †Rhipidomella
 †Rhipidomella hybrida
 †Rhipidomella missouriensis
 †Rhipidomella penelope
 †Rhipidomella perminuta
 †Rhipidomella tenuicosta – or unidentified comparable form
 †Rhipidomella vanuxemi
 †Rhipidothyris
 †Rhombopora
 †Rhombopora simplex
 †Rhombotrypa
 †Rhombotrypa quadrata
  †Rhynchonella
 †Rhynchonella gainesi
 †Rhynchonella scobina
 †Rhynchonella tenuistriata
 †Rhynchopora
 †Rhynchopora beecheri
 †Rhynchopora perryensis – tentative report
 †Rhynchopora rowleyi – tentative report
 †Rhynchotrema
 †Rhynchotrema denatum
 †Rhynchotrema dentatum
 †Rhynchotreta
 †Rhynchotreta americana
 †Rhysocamax
 †Rhysocamax grandis
 †Rhytimya
 †Rhytimya byrnesis
 †Rhytimya mickleboroughi
 †Richmondoceras – type locality for genus
 †Richmondoceras brevicameratum – type locality for species
 †Rineceras
 †Rineceras digonum – tentative report
 †Romingerella
 †Romingerella major – or unidentified comparable form
 †Romingeria
 †Romingeria commutata
 †Romingeria fasciculata
 †Romingeria umbellifera
 †Romingeria uva
 †Ropalonaria
 † Rota
 †Rotiphyllum
 †Rotiphyllum calyculum
 †Roundyella
 †Roundyella mopacifa
 †Rugomena
 †Rugomena vetusta
 †Rugosochonetes
 †Rugosochonetes illinoisensis
 †Rugosochonetes planumbona

S

 †Saccocrinus
 †Saccocrinus benedicti
 †Saccocrinus christyi
 †Saccosompsis
 †Saccosompsis poterium
 †Saffordotaxis
 †Salpingostoma
 †Salpingostoma buelli
 †Salpingostoma richmondense
 †Samaropsis
 †Samaropsis crampii – or unidentified comparable form
 †Sandalodus
 †Sanguinolites
 †Sanguinolites herricki – tentative report
 †Sanguinolites tropidophorus
 †Sapphicorhynchus
 †Sapphicorhynchus sappho
 †Sarocrinus
 †Sarocrinus nitidus
 †Savitrisporites
 †Savitrisporites nux
 †Scalarituba
 †Scalarituba missouriensis
 †Scalites
 †Scalites richmondensis
 †Scenophyllum
 †Scenophyllum conigerum
 †Schellwienella
 †Schellwienella ulrichi
 †Schizobolus
 †Schizobolus concentricus
 †Schizonema – tentative report
 †Schizophoria
 †Schlotheimophyllum
 †Schlotheimophyllum typicum
 †Schoenaster
 †Schoenaster fimbriatus
 †Schopfites
 †Schopfites colchesterensis
 †Schopfites dimorphus
 †Schuchertella
 †Schuchertella costatula
 †Schuchertella lens – tentative report
 †Schuchertella subplana
 †Schuchertoceras
 †Schuchertoceras geniculatum
 †Schuchertoceras prolongatum
 †Schuchertoceras rotundum
 †Schulzospora
 †Schulzospora rara
  †Scytalocrinus
 †Scytalocrinus decadactylus
 †Scytalocrinus disparilis – or unidentified comparable form
 †Scytalocrinus robustus
 †Senftenbergia
 †Senftenbergia pennaeformis
 †Septopora
 †Septopora cestriensis
 †Septopora subquadrans
 †Serpulopsis
 †Serpulopsis jacobschapelensis
 †Serpulospira
 †Serpulospira planispira
 †Setigerites
 †Setigerites setiger
 †Setigerites setigerus
 †Shideleroceras
 †Shideleroceras gracile
 †Shivaella
 †Shivaella nicklesi
 †Sibyrhynchus – type locality for genus
 †Sibyrhynchus denisoni – type locality for species
 †Siderella
 †Siderella scotti
 †Sidetes
 †Sievertsia
   †Sigillaria
 †Sigillaria brardii
 †Sigillaria davreuxi
 †Sigillaria kidstoni – tentative report
 †Sigillaria mamillaris – or unidentified comparable form
 †Sigillaria monostigma
 †Sigillaria scutellata
 †Sigillariostrobus
 †Sigillariostrobus quadrangularis
 †Silenites
 †Silenites warei – or unidentified comparable form
 †Sinochonetes
 †Sinochonetes lepidus
 †Sinuites
 †Sinuites cancellatus
 †Sinuites subcompressa
 †Sinuitina
 †Siphonophrentis
 †Siphonophrentis elongata
 †Siphonophrentis planima
 †Siphonophrentis yandelli
 †Skelidorygma
 †Skelidorygma subcardiiformis
 †Skenidioides
 Sorosphaera – tentative report
 †Sowerbyella
 †Sowerbyella rugosa
 †Spackmanites
 †Spackmanites facierugosus – or unidentified comparable form
 †Spackmanites habibii
 †Spathella
 †Spathella illinoiensis
 †Spathiocaris
 †Spathognathodus
 †Spathognathodus snadjri – or unidentified comparable form
 †Spatiopora
  †Sphaerexochus
 †Sphaerexochus romingeri
 †Sphaerirhynchia
 †Sphaerirhynchia stricklandi
  †Sphaerocodium
 †Sphaerocyclus – report made of unidentified related form or using admittedly obsolete nomenclature
 †Sphaerocyclus tuber
 †Sphenophyllostachys
  †Sphenophyllum
 †Sphenophyllum cuneifolium
 †Sphenophyllum emarginatum
 †Sphenophyllum hauchecornei
 †Sphenophyllum myriophyllum
 †Sphenophyllum plurifoliatum
  †Sphenopteris
 †Sphenopteris broadheadi
 †Sphenopteris shatzlarensis
 †Sphenosphaera
 †Sphenosphaera mohri
 †Sphenosphaera subangularis – type locality for species
 †Spinocyrtia
 †Spinocyrtia euryteines
 †Spinozonotriletes
 †Spinulicosta
 †Spinulicosta spinulicosta
 †Spinyplatyceras
 †Spinyplatyceras milleri
  †Spirifer
 †Spirifer angusta
 †Spirifer bifurcatus
 †Spirifer byrnesi
 †Spirifer crawfordsvillensis
 †Spirifer floydensis – tentative report
 †Spirifer fornaculus
 †Spirifer increbescens
 †Spirifer keokuk
 †Spirifer macrus
 †Spirifer montgomeryensis
 †Spirifer mundulus – or unidentified comparable form
 †Spirifer pellaensis – tentative report
 †Spirifer rostellatus
 †Spirifer shepardi – or unidentified related form
 †Spirifer shephardi – or unidentified related form
 †Spirifer tenuicostatus
 †Spirifer tenuimarginatus
 †Spirifer varicosus
 †Spirifer veronensis – or unidentified comparable form
 †Spirifer washingtonensis
 Spiropteris
  Spirorbis
 †Spiroscala
 †Sporangites
 †Sporangites huronensis
 †Springericrinus
 †Springericrinus doris – tentative report
 †Springericrinus magniventrus – tentative report
 †Spyroceras
 †Spyroceras nuntium
 †Stacheia
 †Stacheia cicatrix
 †Stacheia trepeilopsiformis
 †Staurocephalus
 †Stegerhynchus
 †Stegerhynchus indianense
 †Stegerhynchus indianensis
 †Stegerhynchus neglectum – or unidentified comparable form
 †Stegerhynchus neglectus
 †Stegerhynchus whitii
 †Stelastellara
 †Stelastellara parvula
 †Stelliporella
 †Stelliporella lamellata – or unidentified comparable form
 †Stenoloron
 †Stenoloron swallovana – type locality for species
 †Stenopareia
 †Stenoscisma
 †Stenoscisma explanatum
 †Stephanocrinus
 †Stephanocrinus cornetti
 †Stephanocrinus elongatus
 †Stephanocrinus gemmiformis
 †Stephanocrinus obpyramidalis
 †Stephanocrinus quinquepartitus
 †Stereolasma
 †Stereolasma exile – tentative report
 †Stereolasma parvulum
 †Stethacanthulus – type locality for genus
 †Stethacanthulus longipeniculus – type locality for species
 †Stethacanthulus meccaensis
     †Stethacanthus
 †Stethacanthus altonensis
 †Stethacanthus longipeniculus – type locality for species
 †Stictoporina
 †Stictoporina granulifera
    †Stigmaria
 †Stigmaria ficoides
 †Stigmaria wedingtonensis
 †Stigmatella
 †Stigmatella dubia
 †Stinocrinus
 †Stiptocrinus
 †Stiptocrinus benedicti
 †Stiptocrinus howardi
 †Stiptocrinus ornatus
 Stomatopora
 †Straparollus
 †Straparollus planodiscus
 †Straparollus quadrivolvis – type locality for species
 †Straparollus spergenensis – type locality for species
 †Streblotrypa
 †Streblotrypella
 †Streptelasma
 †Streptelasma divaricans
 †Streptelasma vagans
 †Striatopora
 †Striatopora alba – tentative report
 †Striatopora bellistriata
 †Striatopora cavernosa
 †Striatopora flexuosa
 †Stricklandia – tentative report
 †Striispirifer
 †Stromatopora
 †Stromatopora antiqua
 †Stropeodonta
 †Stropheodonta
 †Stropheodonta demissa
 †Strophochonetes
 †Strophochonetes novascotica
 †Strophodonta
 †Strophodonta demissa
   †Strophomena
 †Strophomena concordensis
 †Strophomena erratica
 †Strophomena extenuata
 †Strophomena fissicosta
 †Strophomena inequistriata
 †Strophomena neglecta
 †Strophomena nutans
 †Strophomena planoconvexa
 †Strophomena planumbona
 †Strophomena scottensis
 †Strophomena sulcata
 †Strophomena vestusta
 †Strophonella
 †Strophonella semifasciata
 †Strophonella williamsi
 †Strophostylus
 †Strophostylus cyclostomus
 †Styliolina
 †Stylolina
 †Subglobosochonetes
 †Sulcatina
 †Sulcatina sulcata
 †Sulcoretepora
 †Sumixam – type locality for genus
 †Sumixam maximus – type locality for species
 †Sutcliffia
 †Sutcliffia insignis
 †Synbathocrinus
 †Synbathocrinus swallovi
 †Synbathocrinus swallowvi
 †Synchysidendron
 †Synchysidendron resinosum
  †Syringopora
 †Syringopora hisingeri
 †Syringopora monroensis
 †Syringopora perelegans
 †Syringoporida
 †Syringothyris
 †Syringothyris subcuspidatus – or unidentified comparable form
 †Syringothyris textus

T

 †Tabulipora
 †Tabulipora cestriensis
 †Tabulipora ramosa
 †Taeniodictya
 †Tamiobatis
 †Tamiobatis springeri
 †Tasmanites
  †Taxocrinus
 †Taxocrinus colletti
 †Taxocrinus ungula – tentative report
   †Tentaculites
 †Tentaculites gracilistriatus
 †Tentaculites sterlingensis
 †Tetradium
 †Tetradium huronense
 †Tetranota
 †Tetranota wisconsinensis
 †Tetrasacculus
 †Tetrasacculus stewarte – tentative report
 †Thalamocrinus
  †Thalassinoides
 †Thalassoinoides
 †Thamniscus
 †Thamnopora
 †Thamnopora limitaris
 †Thamnoptychia
 †Thamnoptychia alpenensis
 †Thamnoptychia tuberculata – type locality for species
 †Thecia
 †Thecia minor – or unidentified comparable form
 †Thuraminoides
 †Thuraminoides sphaeroidalis
 Thurammina
 †Thurammina arenicorna
 †Thurammina limbata
 †Thuramminoides
 †Thuramminoides sphaeroidalis
 †Thuroholia
 †Thuroholia spicatus – type locality for species
 †Thymospora
 †Thymospora pseudothiessenii
 †Tolypaminna
 †Tolypaminna frizzelli
 †Tolypaminna rotula
 †Tolypammina
 †Tolypammina bransoni
 †Tolypammina bulbosa
 †Tolypammina cyclops
 †Tolypammina gersterensis
 †Tolypammina jacobschapelensis
 †Tolypammina laocoon – or unidentified related form
 †Tolypammina rotula
 †Torispora
 †Torispora securis
 †Torynifer
 †Torynifer pseudolineata
 †Torynifer pseudolineatus
 †Torynifer salemensis
 †Torynifer setiger
 †Tremanotus
 †Tremanotus chicagoensis
 †Trematis
 †Trematis millepuntata
 †Trematis millipunctata
 †Trematocystis
 †Trematocystis magniporatus
 †Trematopora
 †Trepeilopsis
 †Trepeilopsis glomospiroides
 †Trepeilopsis recurvidens
 †Trepeilopsis spiralis
  †Treptoceras
 †Treptoceras cincinnatiensis
 †Treptoceras duseri
 †Treptoceras fosteri
 †Treptoceras hitzi
 †Triamara
 †Triamara laevis
 †Triamara tumida
 †Triamara ventricosa – type locality for species
 †Triangulotarbus – type locality for genus
 †Triangulotarbus terrehautensis – type locality for species
 †Tricopelta
 †Tricopelta breviceps
  †Tricrepicephalus
 †Trigonocarpus
 †Trigonoglossa
 †Trimerella
 †Trimerus
 †Trimerus delphinocephalus
 †Trimoceras
 †Trimoceras gilberti
 †Triplesia
 †Triplesia putillus
 †Triquitrites
 †Triquitrites additus
 †Triquitrites bransonii
 †Triquitrites exiguus
 †Triquitrites minutus
 †Triquitrites protensus
 †Triquitrites spinosus
 †Triquitrites subspinosus
 †Trochonema
 †Trochonema madisonense
 †Trochonema umbilicata – or unidentified comparable form
 †Trochophyllum
 †Troosticrinus
 †Troosticrinus sanctipaulensis
 †Trophocrinus
 †Trophocrinus tumidus
 †Tropidocaris
 †Tropidoleptus
 †Tropidoleptus carinatus
 †Tryplasma
 †Tryplasma parva
 †Tubelelloides
 †Tubelelloides longus
 †Tuberculatosporites
 †Tuberculatosporites robustus
 †Tubulelloides
 †Turneropterum – type locality for genus
 †Turneropterum turneri – type locality for species
 †Turrilepas
 †Twenhofelella
 †Twenhofelella waldroni – type locality for species
 †Tylothyris

U

 †Undulabucania
 †Undulabucania gorbyi – type locality for species
 †Unispirifer
 †Unispirifer lateralis
 †Unispirifer rundlensis – or unidentified related form
 †Uperocrinus
 †Uperocrinus apheles

V

 †Valvisporites
 †Vandelooaster
 †Vandelooaster plicatilis
 †Vaurealispongia
 †Vaurealispongia minuta – type locality for species
 †Vermiforichnus
 †Vermiformichnus
 †Verrucosisporites
 †Verrucosisporites microtuberosus
 †Verrucosisporites verrucosus
 †Vesicaspora
 †Vesicaspora wilsonii
 †Vesicasporites
 †Vesicasporites wilsonii
 †Vestispora
 †Vestispora costata
 †Vestispora fenestrata
 †Vestispora foveata
 †Vestispora laevigata
 †Vestispora pseudoreticulata
 †Voiseyella
 †Voiseyella novamexicana
 †Voiseyells
 †Voiseyells novamexicana – or unidentified related form
 †Vorticina
 †Vorticina cyrtolites

W

 †Waltzispora
 †Waltzispora prisca
 †Warsawia
 †Warsawia lateralis
 †Waylandella
 †Waylandella dartyensis
 †Welleroceras
 †Welleroceras liratum
 †Whitfieldella
 †Whitfieldella intermedia
 †Whitfieldella nitida
 †Whitfieldoceras – tentative report
 †Whitfieldoceras casteri
 †Whittleseya
 †Wilsonicrinus
 †Wilsonicrinus discoideus
 †Wilsoniella
 †Wilsoniella saffordi
 †Wilsonites
 †Wilsonites circularis
 †Wilsonites vesicatus
 †Worthenopora
 †Worthenopora spinosa

X

 †Xenocrinus

Y

 †Youngiella – tentative report

Z

 †Zaphrenthis
 †Zaphrenthis aequus
 †Zaphrenthis phrygia
 †Zeacrinites
 †Zeacrinites doverensis
 †Zeacrinites trapezinatus
 †Zeacrinites wortheni
 †Zittelloceras
 †Zittelloceras hitzi
 †Zittelloceras lentidilatatum
 †Zittelloceras shidleri
 †Zonidiscus
 †Zonidiscus youngi
  †Zoophycos
 †Zophocrinus
 †Zophocrinus howardi
 †Zygospira
 †Zygospira modesta

References

 

Paleozoic
Life
Indiana